Cultural regions of Belarus are historical and ethnographic regions that are located in the boundaries of what is now Belarus and are distinguished by a set of ethnocultural features: ethnic history, nature of settlement, economic activities and tools, folk architecture, arts and crafts, traditional clothing, folklore and local dialects.

'Padzvínnie')
 
 
  
  and 
Researchers contest the definitions of these regions. In the case of Padzvinne, the Belarusian historian  contests its existence as a unified region and instead writes that there are two regions in that area.

Sources 

Historical regions in Belarus